Pop Idol was a British television talent show that ran for two series, in 2001 and 2003. The show was produced for ITV in a reality television format and aimed to unearth a previously undiscovered singer who could become an international success. Will Young was the winner of the first series and was awarded with a £1 million music recording contract.  Young became the most successful contestant with a series of top-five hits, including his debut single "Anything Is Possible" / "Evergreen", which peaked at number one on the UK Singles Chart in 2002 and broke chart sales figure records. During the next seven years he recorded two further number-one singles ("Light My Fire" and "Leave Right Now"), while two of his four albums were number-one in the UK Albums Chart. In the second series, Michelle McManus emerged victorious. Her debut single "All This Time" charted at number one in January 2003. Her second single, "The Meaning of Love", charted at a peak of number 16 and an album of the same name reached number three in the UK Albums Chart.

A number of artists who did not win either series of Pop Idol have also had success in the British charts. Gareth Gates, who finished as the runner-up behind Young in the first series, scored a number-one hit with a cover of "Unchained Melody" in March 2002, replacing Young's debut single at the top of the charts. Gates' subsequent releases "Anyone of Us (Stupid Mistake)" and the double A-side "The Long and Winding Road" / "Suspicious Minds" both reached the top of the charts in 2002. After "What My Heart Wants to Say" ended this run of number-one singles, Gates was joined by The Kumars to record the Comic Relief single for 2003, "Spirit in the Sky". He achieved several more top-20 hits in 2003. After three years away from the music industry, Gates briefly returned in 2007 with a new album – Pictures of the Other Side, which charted at number 23 – and two top-40 singles.

Darius Danesh, who finished in third place in the first series, had a string of successful singles and a top-10 album, including his debut single "Colourblind", which reached number one in August 2002. Other contestants from the first series to have chart success were Sarah Whatmore (who failed to make the selection for the live shows), Rosie Ribbons, Rik Waller, Jessica Garlick and Zoe Birkett. Garlick was additionally chosen to represent the United Kingdom at the Eurovision Song Contest in 2002, where she finished third in the competition. Sam Nixon and Mark Rhodes were the only contestants from the second series, other than McManus, to release a charting single. Rhodes finished as runner-up in the competition while Nixon finished third. Within months they formed a duo under the name Sam & Mark. They released a cover of The Beatles' "With a Little Help from My Friends" as a double-A side with "Measure of a Man". This earned them a debut number-one single in January 2002, while they also reached the top-20 with a follow-up, "The Sun Has Come Your Way" before being dropped by their record label, 19.

As of December 2015, Pop Idol contestants have had 14 charting albums, with McManus the only participant from the second series to peak inside the top-100. Forty-three singles released by Pop Idol contestants have charted in the United Kingdom. Young has had 17 singles peak within the top-100, followed by Gates with nine entries. Darius Danesh has also had six charting songs.

Singles

Only songs charted in the Top-100 in the UK Singles Chart are included in this list.

Albums

Solo albums
Only albums that charted in the Top 100 of the UK Albums Chart are included in this list.

Pop Idol albums
In addition to the solo material released by the contestants, Sony BMG released two CDs featuring songs performed by the finalists, one for each series of the show.

Other releases
Several contestants also released songs which failed to reach the main singles or albums charts. Rosie Ribbons recorded an album entitled Misbehaving but was dropped by her record label, Telstar Records, when they ran into financial difficulties and the album was only released in a promotional version. Jessica Garlick released "Hard Not to Fall" as a download single on 11 May 2009 to coincide with the Eurovision Song Contest 2009.

Will Young additionally appeared as a featured artist on the Band Aid 20 UK number-one charity single "Do They Know It's Christmas?" in 2004.

By artist

Chart records
"Unchained Melody" and "Anything Is Possible" / "Evergreen" became two of the most successful singles of the 2000s, selling more than 1 million copies, two of only 10 songs that achieved that feat during the decade. "Anything Is Possible" / "Evergreen" sold 385,000 copies during its first day of sale in a single chain of record stores, Virgin Megastores, beating the total of 160,000 copies of Hear’Say's "Pure and Simple" in 2001. Hear'Say sold 550,000 during a whole week, while Young had advance orders of 1.2 million copies at HMV record stores. It beat Band Aid's record of 750,000 sales in the first week of release, eventually reaching 1.2 million sales. Young's song was named as the biggest-selling single of the decade at the end of 2009, with Gates' debut finishing in second place.

Notes
 Jessica Garlick was chosen to represent the United Kingdom in the Eurovision Song Contest 2002, where she performed "Come Back". She finished third in the competition and the song charted at #13 in the UK Singles Chart.
 "The Long and Winding Road" / "Suspicious Minds" was released as a double A-side single. Gareth Gates and Will Young were featured on the former but the latter was sung only by Gates.
 Gareth Gates collaborated with The Kumars from the television programme The Kumars at No. 42 for the 2003 Comic Relief single, a cover of "Spirit in the Sky".
 Sam Nixon and Mark Rhodes recorded under the name Sam & Mark.
 The figure includes the joint number-one "The Long and Winding Road" / "Suspicious Minds".

See also

Popstars (UK TV series) discography
Fame Academy discography
The X Factor (UK) discography

References
General

Specific

External links
Pop Idol IMDb profile
Details on the contestants

Discography
Pop Idol